Wadi Howar (Wadi Howa or Yellow Nile) is a wadi in Sudan and Chad.

Geography 
Originating in the Ennedi Region of Chad Wadi Howar runs through the Sudanese states of North Darfur and Northern to join the Nile north of the great bend opposite Old Dongola. Stretching over 1100 km in west–east direction across the southern fringes of the Libyan Desert, it ordinarily receives 25 mm of rainfall per year.

Holocene period  

Wadi Howar is the remnant of the ancient Yellow Nile, a tributary of the Nile during the Neolithic Subpluvial from about 9500 to 4500 years ago. At  that time Savanna fauna and cattle-herders occupied this region and the southern edge of the Sahara was some 500 km further north than it is today. When the Sahara underwent desertification between 6000 and 4000 years ago, the wadi first became a chain of freshwater lakes and marshes, as shown by Ptolemy's world map, then it became extinct about 2000 years ago.

Archaeology 
Abundant prehistoric sites certify Wadi Howar as a once ecologically favoured area of settlement and a communication route between the inner regions of Africa and the Nile Valley. The hitherto most thoroughly investigated archaeological site in the wadi is Gala Abu Ahmed.

See also 
 African humid period
 Lake Ptolemy

References 

Howar
Nile
Rivers of Sudan
Rivers of Chad
International rivers of Africa
Chad–Sudan border
North Darfur